Kasthuri Raja is an Indian film director. He is the father of director Selvaraghavan and actor Dhanush. He worked as an assistant director with Director K.S.G. Most of the films he directed were either village based or infatuation of youngsters. He also worked with Director Visu on more than 16 films. Prior to entering the film industry, he ran away from home to Chennai and worked in a mill.

Filmography
As director

As an actor
Aval Sumangalithan (1985)
Mouna Mozhi (1992)

As lyricist
Solaiyamma - all songs
Dreams - all songs
Thaai Manasu - all songs
Kummi Paatu - all songs

References

External links

Living people
People from Theni district
Film directors from Chennai
21st-century Indian film directors
Tamil film directors
20th-century Indian film directors
Film producers from Chennai
1952 births